Ordinary Heroes is a narrative, nonfiction account of World War II as told through the perspective of veterans who served in various theatres of the conflict.  Beginning with the Japanese attack on Pearl Harbor in 1941 and ending sometime after V-J Day, the book recounts the soldiers’ experiences at home and abroad, describing in detail what it was like to be at war.  The stories are pulled from interviews conducted by the authors, which were verified and assembled into a timeline.  Thus, the tales are presented chronologically as the war progresses.

Stylistically, Ordinary Heroes resembles a novel, as it is written from a third-person limited perspective and often forgoes sweeping historical commentary in favor of internal dialogue and introspection.  Its focus lies squarely upon the shoulders of the characters and their personal experiences.

Of the sixty-plus men and women in the book, the majority are originally from – or currently reside in – Berks County, Pennsylvania, in the United States.

2008 non-fiction books
History books about World War II
Non-fiction books about war
People from Berks County, Pennsylvania
Oral history books
CreateSpace books